is a Japanese politician formerly serving in the House of Representatives in the Diet (national legislature) as an independent. A native of Yao, Osaka he attended University of California, Los Angeles and summer school at Harvard University in the United States. He entered Teikyo University in April 2005. He was elected for the first time in 2005. His father Torao Tokuda is also a politician, as well as head of the Tokushukai hospital group. In February 2013, Takeshi Tokuda resigned from his Diet post as parliamentary secretary in charge of infrastructure and transport as well as reconstruction, after tabloid Shūkan Shinchō ran a story alleging he had raped an intoxicated 19-year-old, and then when the victim filed a civil suit against him for damages came to an out-of-court settlement with her for ¥10 million. In public comments, Tokuda apologised for causing trouble but refused comment on the issue, stating that he had agreed not to discuss it.  On February 24, 2014, he submitted his resignation from the Diet due to guilt-by-association rules of the Public Offices Election Law.

References

External links
 Official website

Members of the House of Representatives (Japan)
Koizumi Children
University of California, Los Angeles alumni
Harvard University alumni
Politicians from Kagoshima Prefecture
People from Yao, Osaka
Living people
1971 births
Liberal League (Japan) politicians
People from the Amami Islands